Pakistan is home to many mountains above .

Most of Pakistan's high peaks are located in the Karakoram range, the highest of which is K2  8611 meter long, the second-highest peak on earth. The highest peak of Himalayan range in Pakistan is Nanga Parbat, which is the ninth-highest peak of the world.

Following are the mountain ranges that are fully or partially included in Pakistan:
Karakoram, including the world's second-highest peak, K2
Himalayas; highest peak in Pakistan is Nanga Parbat
Hindu Kush; highest peak is Tirich Mir.
Hindu Raj in northern Pakistan, part of the eastern Hindu Kush, highest peak is Koyo Zom (6,872 m (22,546 ft)). 
Spīn Ghar, starting from Tora Bora on the border with eastern Afghanistan west of the Khyber Pass, highest peak is Mount Sikaram (4,755 m (15,600)) .
Sulaiman Mountains; highest peak is Takht-e-Sulaiman.
Margalla Hills in Punjab whose highest peak is Tilla Charouni
Salt Range, a hill system in the Punjab Province that is abundant in salt; highest peak is Sakaser 
Toba Kakar, a southern offshoot of the Hindu Kush in Balochistan
Makran Range, a semi-desert coastal strip in the south of Balochistan, in Iran and Pakistan near the coast of the Arabian Sea. The narrow coastal plain rises very rapidly into several mountain ranges.
Ras Koh Range
Chagai Range
Kirthar Range, located along the Balochistan and Sindh provincial border.
Kirana Hills, The Kirana Hills is a small and extensive rocky mountain range located in Chiniot and Rabwah, Pakistan. Kirana-I nuclear tests were conducted in these hills.

See also 
 List of mountain passes in Pakistan
 Mountain ranges in Pakistan

References 

 
Pakistan, Lists of mountain ranges of
Ranges
Ranges